Ilya Olegovich Detyonyshev (born 23 January 2003) is a Russian football player who plays for FC Chayka Peschanokopskoye.

Club career
He made his debut in the Russian Football National League for FC Spartak-2 Moscow on 22 August 2020 in a game against FC Irtysh Omsk.

References

External links
 
 Profile by Russian Football National League

2003 births
Sportspeople from Ulyanovsk
Living people
Russian footballers
Russia youth international footballers
Association football defenders
FC Spartak-2 Moscow players
FC Chayka Peschanokopskoye players
Russian First League players